General Healthcare Group PLC (GHG) is a British healthcare company. It owns BMI Healthcare.  BMI operates 54 hospitals  and clinics in the United Kingdom.

History
The name "General Healthcare Group" dates to 1993, when AMI, a US for-profit hospital provider which had expanded into the UK in the 1970s, renamed itself BMI Healthcare, creating GHG as its corporate group name. AMI had been floated on the London Stock Exchange in 1988, and was acquired by Generale de Santé (a subsidiary of Compagnie Générale des Eaux) in 1990.

In 1997 both Generale de Santé and GHG were acquired by private equity group Cinven, with BMI's international activities transferred to Generale de Santé, leaving BMI Healthcare active only in the UK. In 1998 Amicus Healthcare Group was acquired from Compass Group and merged into GHG. Cinven sold GHG to another private equity group in 2000, and a consortium led by South African healthcare group Netcare acquired the company in 2006.

In 2008 BMI purchased nine hospitals in Birmingham, Bury St Edmunds, Gerrards Cross, Harrogate, Huddersfield, Lancaster, Lincoln, North London and Nottingham from Nuffield Health to build on their existing BMI Healthcare business.

In 2018, BMI sold 35 of its hospitals to Hospital Topco Limited.

See also
Private healthcare in the United Kingdom

References

External links

Health care companies of the United Kingdom
Health care companies established in 1970
Private medicine in the United Kingdom
1970 establishments in England